Live in Denver may refer to:

 Live in Denver, a 2007 album by King Crimson 
 Live in Denver, a live DVD by Panic! at the Disco
 G3: Live in Denver, a live DVD by G3